Matthew Hall (born 1970) is a Canadian figure skater. He is the 1989 bronze medalist at the Canadian Figure Skating Championships as well as the 1989 Canada Games. He trained at the Mariposa School of Skating.

Hall was one of the first elite level athletes to come out as gay while still competing.  He made his sexual orientation public in 1992.

Competitive highlights

References 

 

1970 births
Living people
Canadian male single skaters
Canadian LGBT sportspeople
Gay sportsmen
LGBT figure skaters
20th-century Canadian people
21st-century Canadian people
21st-century Canadian LGBT people
20th-century Canadian LGBT people
Canadian gay men